Bexar is an unincorporated community in Bexar County, in the U.S. state of Texas. It is located within the Greater San Antonio metropolitan area.

History
Irish farmer and rancher John Kinney (or Kenney) was the community's first settler in 1854. He founded San Patricio de Bexar Catholic church alongside other settlers in 1868. His family operated an open pit coal mine in the area in the mid-1880s. Coal was transported to the area by ox cart to San Antonio. A post office was established at Bexar in 1883 inside the bright red painted general store. As a result, it also goes by the names "La Colorada" or "La Mina de la Colorada". The number of houses in the community ranged from 30 to 45, alongside a general store that was owned and operated by John Conoly and Dr. James A. Matthews. Other businesses in the community in 1894 included a doctor's office, a theater, the post office, a cotton gin, a dance hall, a cantina, and three churches. The Artesian Belt Railroad then passed by Bexar in 1909. Most of the area was integrated into nearby Somerset when it was established two miles east of the community along the railroad. Another railway spur was connected to the coal mine. Its economy shifted to oil production when it was discovered in Somerset by CC Kurtz in 1913 and became the largest oil-producing field in the world at the time. The community subsequently declined, when the general store closed, and all three churches were relocated to Somerset. There were three cemeteries and several scattered houses in Bexar in the late 2000s. The post office closed in 1907, with no population estimates. In the 1930s, the community had a church, a store, and a cemetery.

Geography

Education
Bexar is served by the Somerset Independent School District.

Notable person
 James Richard Curry, American serial killer

References

Unincorporated communities in Bexar County, Texas
Unincorporated communities in Texas
Greater San Antonio